Vohra Patel or Vora Patel is a Sunni Muslim community in Gujarat, India, primarily in the Bharuch district.

References

Muslim communities of Gujarat